The Fenster School of Southern Arizona is a school located in Catalina Foothills, Arizona, United States. Its college-preparatory curriculum offers students an opportunity to take courses for high school as well as towards college credit. Fenster School offers boarding and day student programs.

The school closed in 2016 and the campus is now home to Sabino Recovery Integrative Health and Wellness.

Accreditation
The Fenster school was accredited by the North Central Association of Colleges and Schools.

References

External links
 School website

Private high schools in Arizona
Boarding schools in Arizona
Schools in Tucson, Arizona
Preparatory schools in Arizona